Georgia State Route 32 Truck may refer to:

Georgia State Route 32 Truck (Douglas): a truck route of State Route 32 that exists entirely in Douglas
Georgia State Route 32 Truck (Leesburg): a truck route of State Route 32 that exists partially in Leesburg

032 Truck